Sun Su Chen (孫素真) (16 October 1895 - 23 February 1975) was the 18th matriarch of Yiguandao. She was the successor of Zhang Tianran, Yiguandao's contemporary founder. Sun was also known as Ming Shan (明善) or Hui Ming (慧明), her religious name.
 
Sun was born in Shan County, Shandong on the 28th day of the eighth lunar month in 1895. She was introduced to Yiguandao in 1908 and became the student of Lu Zhongyi. All the incident which was believed to be Heaven's will and lifted her as the incarnation of the Yuehui "Moon Wisdom" Bodhisattva, the counterpart of Ji Gong. Heaven's will regarded her to hold the seat of the 18th patriarch together with Zhang in 1930.

After the death of Zhang in 1947, she took control of Yiguandao. Many of Zhang's followers followed her leadership. Only a small fraction stayed on with Madame Liu.

When the communists took over China in 1949, Sun moved to Hong Kong. She then went to Kuala Lumpur, Malaysia for a short period (1951–52) then returned to Hong Kong.

In Hong Kong she was said to have left behind a large number of "heavenly mandates". To this day, there are a few elders in Hong Kong who are believed to be the keepers of these heavenly mandates.

In 1954, she moved to Taiwan. Because Yiguandao was illegal in China under communism, she kept a low profile and was kept under seclusion. She was sick in the last years and under the care of a nun surnamed Zhou in Taichung. Later she was under the care of Wang Hao De until her death. She died on the 23rd day of the second lunar month in 1975 (4 April 1975) one day before the death of Chiang Kai-shek.

She was buried in Daxi, Taoyuan. She was given the title Zhonghua Shengmu (Holy Mother of the Chinese) by her followers.

References
 David Jordan & Daniel Overmyer. 1985. The Flying Phoenix: Aspects of Chinese Sectarianism in Taiwan. Princeton University Press.
 Soo Khin Wah. 1997. A Study of the Yiguan Dao (Unity Sect) and its Development in Peninsular Malaysia. Ph.D. dissertation, University of British Columbia.

External links
 History of Sun Su Zhen according to her followers
 The patriarch of I Kuan Tao
 History of I Kuan Tao according to the followers

1895 births
1975 deaths
I-Kuan Tao Patriarchs
People from Heze
Taiwanese people from Shandong
Deified Taiwanese people